ABC miłości (ABC of Love) is a 1935 Polish film directed by Michał Waszyński.

Cast
Adolf Dymsza... Wincenty Poziomka
Maria Bogda ... Helenka
Kazimierz Krukowski ... Krupkowski, revue actor
Basia Wywerkówna ... Basienka
Konrad Tom ... Lowelas
Ludwik Lawiński ... Director of Kosmos-Film
Józef Orwid ... Revue director
Eugeniusz Koszutski ... Dentist
Helena Zarembina ... Florcia Słowikówna
Monika Carlo ... Revue actor
Ewa Erwicz
Leon Rechenski
Aniela Miszczykówna
Jan Bielicz
Jan Dobosz-Bielicz
Karol Hubert
Zygmunt Regro-Regirer

External links 
 

1935 films
1930s Polish-language films
Polish black-and-white films
Films directed by Michał Waszyński
Polish comedy films
1935 comedy films